The 2008 FIM Motocross World Championship was the 52nd F.I.M. Motocross Racing World Championship season.

Grands Prix

MX1

Entry List

Championship standings

Riders' Championship

Manufacturers' Championship

MX2

Entry List

Riders' Championship

Manufacturers' Championship

MX3

Riders' Championship

Manufacturers' Championship

External links
 

FIM Motocross World Championship season
2008